Together We Are Río Negro (JSRN) is a provincial political party in the Río Negro Province of Argentina. It was formed in 2015 as an electoral coalition to back the candidacy to the governorship of incumbent Alberto Weretilneck; it was later officially registered as a political party. 

Members of the original coalition formed in 2015 included the provincial chapters of the Broad Front, the Victory Party and the Faith Party, and provincial parties such as the Patagonic People's Movement. It currently holds a majority of seats in the provincial legislature and the incumbent governor, Arabela Carreras, belongs to JSRN. In addition, the party counts with representation at the federal level in both chambers of the National Congress, with Weretilneck serving in the Senate and Luis Di Giacomo serving in the Chamber of Deputies, both since 2019.

Electoral results

Chamber of Deputies

Senate

Río Negro governorship

Río Negro provincial legislature

References

External links
Official website of the JSRN bloc in the Río Negro Legislature (in Spanish)

Provincial political parties in Argentina
Río Negro Province
2015 establishments in Argentina
Political parties established in 2015
Peronist parties and alliances in Argentina